Yobaín is a town and the municipal seat of the Yobaín Municipality, Yucatán in Mexico.

References

Populated places in Yucatán